Josep Figueras Marimont (born in Medinya, 16 September 1963) is a Spanish physician, health policy expert, and health services researcher who serves as the director of the European Observatory on Health Systems and Policies.

Biography 
Born in Medinyà, Girona, Spain, Josep was educated at the University of Barcelona where he received his medical degree with honors in 1983, after which he specialized in family medicine in 1987 at the University of Valencia. He proceeded to move to the United Kingdom where he obtained a Master of Public Health from the University of Leeds, and a MSc and Ph.D. (econ) in health planning and financing from the London School of Economics and London School of Hygiene and Tropical Medicine, wherefore he worked as a lecturer and MSc course director in Health Services Management and Policy.

Professional career 
He is the Founding Director and Head of the European Centre for Health Policy of the World Health Organization, also known as the European Observatory on Health Systems and Policies, a leading think tank in public health. He has acted as a policy adviser in more than 40 countries within the European region and beyond and has served the European Commission and the World Bank. He is part of several governing, advisory and editorial boards, including the presidential position on the board of accreditation of the Agency for Public Health Education Accreditation and member of the board of the European Health Forum Gastein.  He is currently a visiting professor at Imperial College London.

Health systems and policies research 
His research focuses on comparative health system and policy analysis. He is an editor of the Observatory series published by the Open University Press, and has published a wide range of volumes in this field, most recently: “Strengthening Health System Governance: Better policies, stronger performance” (2017); “Health systems governance” (2015); “Economic crisis: impact and implications for health systems policy in Europe” (2014); “Health systems, health and wealth: assessing the case for investing in health systems” (2012); “Health professional mobility and health systems. Evidence from 17 European countries” (2011); and “Cross-border health care in the European Union. Mapping and analyzing practices and policies” (2011). He is the originator and editor of the Health Systems in Transition (HiT) series, which introduces health systems in a common comparative framework.

Honors and awards 
Figueras is an honorary fellow of the Faculty of Public Health Medicine (United Kingdom) and was Director of the MSc in Health Services Management and lecturer at the London School of Hygiene & Tropical Medicine. In 2006 he received the Andrija Stampar Medal for excellence in Public Health and a Doctorate Honoris Causa from Semmelweis University in 2016.  Figueras has twice been awarded the European Health Management Association (EHMA) prize for the best annual publication on policy and management.

Select Bibliography 
 Saltman, Richard B., Josep Figueras, and World Health Organization. "European health care reform: analysis of current strategies." (1997).

References 

1959 births
Living people
People from Girona
University of Barcelona alumni
Spanish expatriates in the United Kingdom
Alumni of the University of Leeds
University of Valencia alumni
World Health Organization officials
20th-century Spanish physicians
21st-century Spanish physicians